Hyper is a 2016 Indian Telugu-language action-comedy drama film  directed by Santosh Srinivas and produced by 14 Reels Entertainment. The film features Ram Pothineni, Raashi Khanna, and Sathyaraj in the lead roles, while Rao Ramesh, Murali Sharma, Naresh, Thulasi Shivamani, Sayaji Shinde, Posani Krishna Murali, and Brahmaji play supporting roles. The songs featured in the film are composed by Ghibran, while the background score is composed by Mani Sharma. The film was released worldwide on 30 September 2016.

Plot
Narayana Murthy (Sathyaraj) is an honest government employee. His son Suryanarayana Murthy "Surya" (Ram Pothineni) loves him in such a way that he is ready to die or kill anyone. One day when he was about to meet with an accident, Gaja (Murali Sharma) a gangster protects him. The two becomes friends. One day Rajappa (Rao Ramesh) blackmails Narayana Murthy to get approval for a building which was illegally constructed. Rajappa orders Gaja, his right-hand man, to kill Narayana Murthy's family. The rest of the story follows Surya as he tries to protect his family from Rajappa.

Cast

 Ram Pothineni as Suryanarayana Murthy "Surya" 
 Raashi Khanna as Bhanumathi
 Sathyaraj as Narayana Murthy, Suri's father
 Rao Ramesh as Minister Rajappa 
 Murali Sharma as Gaja Bhai
 Naresh as Narayana Murthy's friend
 Tulasi as Suri's mother
 Sayaji Shinde as Udaya Shankar (Special Officer)
 Suman as Rama Chandra, Priyanka's fiancé's father 
 Posani Krishna Murali as Bhanumathi's father
 Brahmaji as Bhanumathi's boss
 Hema as Bhanumathi's mother
 Annapoorna as Suri's grandmother
 Mamilla Shailaja Priya as Gaja's wife
 Prabhas Sreenu as Raghupati Raghava Rajaram, Gaja's henchman
 Fish Venkat as Rajappa's henchmen
 K. Vishwanath as Chief Minister
 Chandra Mohan as Priest
 Suddala Ashok Teja as Chief Secretary
 Jaya Prakash Reddy as Party President
 Praveen as Pandit 
 Satyam Rajesh as Traffic Police Officer
 G. V. Sudhakar Naidu as Local Goon
 Sivannarayana Naripeddi as Rajappa's brother-in-law 
 Priyanka Nalkari as Priyanka, Suri's sister
 Venkata Giridhar Vajja

Soundtrack

The music for the songs is composed by M. Ghibran and released on Lahari Music company. Mani Sharma composed the background score of the film.

Reception 
A critic from The Hindu wrote that "Sathyaraj and Rao Ramesh, who steals the show yet again, are the film’s saving grace". Pranitha Jonnalagedda of The Times of India said that "The film is predictable at places and endearing at times. But on the whole, it feels like watching paint dry. Here’s a film which has its heart in the right place but the beats aren’t quite right". Jeevi of Idlebrain.com opined that "On a whole, Hyper is a film made for the masses". A critic from 123telugu said that "On the whole, Hyper is a typical masala entertainer which has some entertaining moments".

References

External links
 Santosh Srinivas Exclusive Interview About Hyper
 

2016 films
2010s Telugu-language films
2010s action comedy-drama films
2016 masala films
Films scored by Mohamaad Ghibran
Indian action comedy-drama films
Films directed by Santosh Srinivas